Venolyn "Miss Clarke" Clarke (born Venolyn Clarke; 11 July 1967, in Jamaica) is a former sprinter who specialized in the 100 metres. In 2001, Clarke held the position of the fourth fastest woman in Canada. Clarke's personal best time was 11.29 seconds, achieved in July 2001 in Ottawa, Ontario.

Sprinting career
Clarke reached the quarter-final at the 2001 World Championships, but got disqualified due to a failed drugs test.

It was later revealed that at a World Championships pre-camp, Clarke had tested positive for stanozolol. In an interview, she cried and repeatedly denied that she used any stanozolol. Clarke's coach, Clive Foster, also denied that Clarke used any stanozolol. Clarke was the first athlete to fail a drugs test at the 2001 World Championships. This caused Clake to get expelled from the world championships. Later, the Canadian Centre for Ethics in Sport allowed her to compete again.

References

External links
 
 
 

1967 births
Living people
Canadian female sprinters
Black Canadian female track and field athletes
Canadian sportspeople in doping cases
Doping cases in athletics
Jamaican emigrants to Canada
Naturalized citizens of Canada
Track and field athletes from Ontario
Athletes (track and field) at the 1999 Pan American Games
Athletes (track and field) at the 1998 Commonwealth Games
Pan American Games track and field athletes for Canada
Commonwealth Games competitors for Canada
World Athletics Championships athletes for Canada